Alslev is a town in southwestern Jutland in the Varde Municipality, in Region of Southern Denmark. As of 1 January 2022, it has a population of 1,289.

Aslev and surrounding area was impacted by the F4 tornado that hit multiple towns on november 24, 1928. Minor damage was observed within aslev.

References 

Cities and towns in the Region of Southern Denmark
Varde Municipality